This Is My Battlefield is a 2004 album by the Norwegian industrial music project Panzer AG.

Track listing
 “Introduction Of The Damned” – 1:41
 “Filth God” – 4:45
 “Battlefield” – 5:00
 “Chemical Breed” – 4:05
 “When Death Embrace Me” – 4:43
 “Bereit” (vocals: Aleksandra Skrzypczak) – 3:53
 “Totale Luftherrschaft” – 3:46
 “Sick Is The One Who Adores Me” – 5:27
 “Panzer” – 4:21
 “Tides That Kill” (Panzer AG vs. Symbiont; Collaboration: Symbiont; lyrics: Symbiont) – 5:24
 “God Eats God” – 4:11
 “It Is All In Your Head” – 4:37
 “Behind A Gasmask” – 4:08
 “Pure Tension” – 4:21
 “Drukne I Taarer” – 6:54

Trivia

The track "Battlefield" contains two samples from the movie Day of the Dead repeated throughout the song. It also features a sample of "Dracula -The Beginning" by Wojciech Kilar from the movie Bram Stoker's Dracula
The track "When Death Embrace Me" contains a sample from the movie The Usual Suspects
The track "Sick Is The One Who Adores Me" contains a line from the movie Memento
The track "Drukne I Taarer" contains samples from the movie Lost Souls
The track "God Eats God" contains a sample from the movie Full Metal Jacket

References

2004 albums
Panzer AG albums
Accession Records albums
Metropolis Records albums